Dim Sum King is a Chinese restaurant in Seattle, in the U.S. state of Washington.

Description 
The restaurant offers dim sum a la carte; the menu has included thousand year egg congee and egg tarts. Seattle Refined's list of women-owned businesses says, "Fast service and inexpensive prices make this spot a go-to for people on the run with a craving for dumplings, buns and egg tarts."

History 
In 2020, the restaurant closed temporarily during the COVID-19 pandemic and was vandalized. The restaurant's exterior was painted by local artists. Additionally, a car crashed into the restaurant, injuring seven people.

Reception 
Leonardo David Raymundo and Ryan Lee included the restaurant in Eater Seattle's 2021 list of "14 Delightful Dim Sum Restaurants in the Seattle Area".

See also 

 History of Chinese Americans in Seattle
 List of Chinese restaurants

References

External links

 

Chinatown–International District, Seattle
Chinese restaurants in Seattle
Dim sum